The Shanxi Provincial Library, also known as the Shanxi Library, is a Taiyuan-based comprehensive provincial-level public library, located in Changfeng Business Area, Taiyuan City, Shanxi, China.

History
The construction of the Shanxi Provincial Library began in 1908 and was completed in 1909. On 28 August 1960, the building of the Shanxi Provincial Library was inaugurated and opened to the public independently.

In July 2013, the New Hall of Shanxi Provincial Library was opened, with a total construction area of about 50,000 square metres and a total investment of 350 million yuan.

References

Libraries in China
Buildings and structures in Shanxi
Libraries established in 1909